Paul Mooney: Analyzing White America is a 2002 stand-up comedy film starring comedian Paul Mooney, with Joe Inscoe, Bridget Gethis, and Kate Fleckenstein featured in sitcom-like cut scenes between Mooney's regular stand-up routine.

Among the topics covered are the September 11th terrorist attacks, the "N" word, interracial marriage, Jerry Springer, and white people being obsessed with wild animals to the point of being in danger or being killed. A 2006 reissue of the DVD features a bonus interview by producer/actor Tim Reid (WKRP in Cincinnati, Frank's Place).

Analyzing White America was Mooney's first DVD release, followed by Know Your History: Jesus Is Black; So Was Cleopatra in 2006.

References

External links

Stand-up comedy concert films
2002 films
African-American films
American documentary films
Works about White Americans
2002 comedy films
2000s English-language films
2000s American films